"Love on the Run" is a song by English electronic dance music artist Chicane featuring Northern Irish singer Peter Cunnah. It was released on 24 February 2003 in the United Kingdom, intended to be the lead single from the album Easy to Assemble, which was never released. Co-written with Brian Higgins of Xenomania, the song reached number thirty-three in the UK.

Track listing
 European CD single
 "Love on the Run" (Single Edit) – 3:40
 "Love on the Run" (Chicane Long Mix) – 8:40
 "Love on the Run" (Blank & Jones Remix) – 6:49
 "Love on the Run" (Force Five Remix) – 8:44

Personnel
 Brian Higgins – songwriting
 Nick Bracegirdle – songwriting
 Nadia Jordan – additional lyrics
 Chicane – production
 Walter Coelho – mastering

Source:

Charts

References

Chicane (musician) songs
2003 singles
Songs written by Brian Higgins (producer)
2003 songs
Songs written by Chicane (musician)
Warner Records singles